Bencion (in Catalan and Spanish, Benció) (died 916) was the count of Empúries and Rosselló from 915 to his death.  He was the son of Sunyer II of Empúries, whom he succeeded.

He married Godlana, daughter of Miro the Elder of Conflent and Roussillon.

At the death of his father, he and his brother Gausbert inherited the counties and reigned jointly.  He was the first to die and his brother inherited all of his possessions.

|-

916 deaths
Counts of Empúries
Counts of Roussillon
Year of birth unknown
10th-century Catalan people
10th-century Visigothic people